Batman Unlimited: Animal Instincts is a 2015 American animated superhero film and the first entry in the Batman Unlimited series. It was released on May 12, 2015 on Blu-ray, DVD and Digital HD.

Plot
Gotham City is under attack from a group of animal-related villains who use animal robots to assist them in their crimes. The group, which calls itself the "Animalitia", consists of the Penguin, Cheetah, Man-Bat, Killer Croc, and their leader, a gorilla named Silverback. After foiling various crimes attempted by the group, Batman discovers that all the animal crimes form a perfect circle around Gotham City's newest and tallest building, the Aviary, built by the Penguin. 

That night, Bruce attends a function at the Aviary, where Oswald Cobblepot starts a lecture on "Bumbershoot Mechanics", the company who makes the robots. He introduces the robots' designer, Dr. Kirk Langstrom. Batman puts a minuscule tracking device onto Langstrom. Back at the Batcave, Batman deduces the next animal crime will take place at Gotham Zoo. 

The Animalitia breaks into the zoo, where Man-Bat hears Batman, Red Robin, Nightwing, Green Arrow, and Flash come for them. The robot animals show up again and the heroes attempt to take them down. Green Arrow takes out the bat by firing a surprise arrow out of a tunnel, Nightwing uses a crane to crush the wolf with girders, and Flash tricks the tiger into skidding into a building and breaking. They take the robots to the Batcave for analysis, but they need Langstrom to hack them. They also find out that the animals left something at their last three crime scenes instead of taking something. They use the tracking device to find Langstrom at Bumbershoot Mechanics. Batman has Red Robin stay behind and analyze the robots and Flash discover what they left behind.

At Bumbershoot, the heroes are attacked by the Animalitia. While battling Man-Bat, Batman sees the tracker on him, meaning that Langstrom is Man-Bat. Batman stuns him with a sonic device and they give him a serum to revert him to human form. Langstrom reveals that Penguin assigned him to build the robots for a retrieval mission. An asteroid called the Midas Heart is passing by Earth and the villains want to make the Midas Heart fall into Gotham so they can get the gold at its center. Langstrom reverts to Man-Bat after the serum wears off, but not before giving Batman and Flash a transmitter they can use to create a force field to protect Gotham from the impact of the Midas Heart.

Batman has Red Robin upload a bug to revert the robots to the heroes' side. Penguin takes off in an escape pod, leaving the animals behind. The heroes take out the villains with the robots. Red Robin and Man-Bat show up to help revert the Midas Heart. Flash and Nightwing collect robot parts, and they use Silverback as a power source. Unable to reverse the Midas Heart, Batman has Flash move the generators outside of Gotham and Man-Bat take the robot parts above the city to make a force field to keep Gotham safe. The Midas Heart smashes into the force field with Gotham unharmed, and Man-Bat permanently returns to Langstrom. The villains are taken to prison, and the heroes go their separate ways. Penguin's pod crashes into Antarctica.

Cast
 Roger Craig Smith as Batman/Bruce Wayne
 Dana Snyder as Penguin/Oswald Cobblepot
 Chris Diamantopoulos as Green Arrow/Oliver Queen
 Laura Bailey as Cheetah/Barbara Minerva, Newscaster
 John DiMaggio as Killer Croc/Waylon Jones
 Will Friedle as Nightwing/Dick Grayson
 Yuri Lowenthal as Red Robin/Tim Drake
 Phil LaMarr as Man-Bat/Kirk Langstrom
 Charlie Schlatter as Flash/Barry Allen
 Keith Szarabajka as Silverback
 Richard Epcar as Commissioner James Gordon
 Alastair Duncan as Alfred Pennyworth
 Amanda Troop as Gladys Windsmere, Pretty Girl
 Matthew Mercer as Mech Guard 1, Wealthy Jock
 Eric Bauza as Punk #1, Rookie Cop
 Mo Collins as Dispatch, Distinguished Woman
 Keith Ferguson as Gruff Cop, Distinguished Man

Production
The film's name and character designs are taken from Mattel's toy line. As such, several releases of the video include a small "Bat-Flyer" toy that can be used with the Batman figures from the line (said toy is pictured above for the special Blu-Ray/DVD/Digital release).

Alastair Duncan, who voices Alfred Pennyworth in the film, reprises this role from The Batman.

Sequel
It was followed by a sequel, Batman Unlimited: Monster Mayhem, which was released on August 18, 2015, and 22 short cartoons. A mobile application was released as well.

References

External links
 DC Comics page
 
 Batman Unlimited: Animal Instincts at The World's Finest

2015 animated films
2015 direct-to-video films
2010s animated superhero films
Batman Unlimited (film series)
2010s American animated films
2010s direct-to-video animated superhero films
Films directed by Butch Lukic
Green Arrow in other media
2010s English-language films